Bathyacmaea is a genus of deep-sea limpet, marine gastropod mollusk in the family Pectinodontidae. Species in this genus inhabit the dark, chemosynthesis-based marine communities of ocean vents and cold seeps near Japan.

Species
Species within the genus Bathyacmaea include:

 Bathyacmaea jonassoni Beck, 1996
 Bathyacmaea lactea S. Q. Zhang, J. L. Zhang & S. P. Zhang, 2016 
 Bathyacmaea nipponica Okutani, Tsuchida & Fujikura, 1992
 Bathyacmaea secunda Okutani, Fujikura & Sasaki, 1993
 Bathyacmaea subnipponica Sasaki, Okutani & Fujikura, 2003
 Bathyacmaea tertia Sasaki, Okutani & Fujikura, 2003

References

Pectinodontidae